SHAPE American High School is a US Department of Defense Dependents high school (DoDDS) for grades 9-12 located at Casteau, a town north of the city of Mons in Belgium. SHAPE American High School provides education for the dependents of military personnel and civilian employees at the Supreme Headquarters Allied Powers Europe (SHAPE), a NATO military installation. SHAPE High School adheres to a typical United States curricular and extracurricular program. The current SHAPE American High School was established in 1967 when SHAPE moved from Paris to Mons. The school separated into SHAPE Middle school and SHAPE High School in the 2014-2015 school year with the new completion of two new school buildings.

Demographics

Most students of SHAPE American High School are dependents of the United States Military and US civilian employees, but many are dependents of military members from the many other NATO nations represented at SHAPE. Typically SHAPE American High School has pupils of more than eighteen nationalities and sixteen languages. The students and faculty are exposed to many languages and cultures. American English is the primary language of instruction.

Classes

SHAPE High School offers the following classes:
 Language Arts 7, 8, 9, 10, 11, 12
 Algebra I, Geometry, Algebra II, Pre Calculus, 
 Physics Applications, Chemistry Applications, Biology, Chemistry, Physics
 World History 9, World History 10, US Government, P.E, Drama, Computer Applications, Applied Tech, Health
 Spanish I, II, III, IV French I, II, III, IV, V
 Model United Nations, Yearbook Production, Economics, Psychology, Street law, Sociology, JROTC, Art, Band and Chorus
 Honors Literature 9 and 10 (Can be substituted by Language Arts 9 and 10)
 Honors World History 9 (Can be substituted by World History 9)
 AP French Language and Culture, AP Spanish Language, AP Biology, AP Calculus, AP Chemistry, AP World History, AP Literature, and AP United States Government and Politics
 English as a Second Language (ESL) Intended for foreign students whose English language skills are not sufficient for Language Arts. Students who at the final exams are classified as fully proficient English speakers will attend Language Arts in the new year.

Athletics
Shape American High School had the largest number of DII Football Titles between 1992 and 2012. The football team made playoffs for the 1st time in 2012 since 4 years passing. The boys 1993-94 cross-country team went undefeated and won the Division II European championship. The girls basketball team won the European Championship in 2012. The baseball team won their first Division II European Championship in 2012, led by All-European Award winners James Workman and Clay Coon. Opportunities are available to students in the three secondary sections, including:
 Autumn – Cross Country (running), American Football, Volleyball, Tennis, Cheerleading, and Swimming (sponsored by S.I.S.)
 Winter – Basketball, Wrestling, Cheerleading, and Swimming (S.I.S.)
 Spring – Track and Field, Soccer, Baseball, and Softball

Extracurricular activities

Some of the extracurricular activities offered at SHAPE High School are
 Mathcounts
 Math Olympiads
 Odyssey of the Mind
 Student Government
 Creative Connections
 Model United Nations
 Model United States Senate
 Student 2 Student (S2S)
 Homework Club

Notable alumni and past students
William B. Caldwell IV
Ann E. Dunwoody (1971), first woman 4-star general in U.S. military and uniformed service
Shona McIsaac, former British Member of Parliament (MP)
James Roberts (2005)
Alejandro Villanueva (2006), former Pittsburgh Steelers offensive tackle and former Army Ranger

See also

DODDS
Supreme Headquarters Allied Powers Europe

References

 http://www.nato.int/shape/community/school/us.htm
 http://www.shap-hs.eu.dodea.edu/_pdf/handbook.pdf

International schools in Belgium